The Kemper Log House  is a two-story, double pen log house, which was built in 1804 by the Reverend James Kemper on Kemper Lane, in the Walnut Hills neighborhood.  It was occupied by members of the Kemper family until 1897.  It is one of the oldest houses built in Cincinnati, Ohio that is still standing.  The house was moved in 1912 to the Cincinnati Zoo and then relocated at Heritage Village Museum in Sharon Woods.  Its operation is coordinated with Historic Southwest Ohio, which maintains the village.

References

External links
 Heritage Village: Kemper Log House

Houses completed in 1804
Historic house museums in Ohio
Museums in Hamilton County, Ohio
Log cabins in the United States
Houses in Cincinnati
Relocated buildings and structures in Ohio